The longtail seamoth (Pegasus volitans) is a species of fish in the family Pegasidae. It is found around the coasts of Australia, Bahrain, China, India, Indonesia, Malaysia, Mozambique, Myanmar, the Philippines, Saudi Arabia, Singapore, Taiwan, Tanzania, and Thailand. This fish is used in Chinese medicine and in the aquarium trade.

References

Pegasus (fish)
Fish described in 1758
Taxa named by Carl Linnaeus
Taxonomy articles created by Polbot